Lamprosema tampiusalis is a moth in the family Crambidae. It was described by Francis Walker in 1859. It is found on Borneo and in Thailand, Nepal, China, Myanmar,  Korea and Japan.

The wingspan is 15–17 mm. The forewings and hindwings are light greyish yellow. The hindwings with a slightly black postmedial line.

References

Moths described in 1859
Lamprosema
Moths of Asia